Nélson Moreira de Lemos Alfaia (born 9 November 1966) is a retired Portuguese football defender.

References

1966 births
Living people
Portuguese footballers
S.C. Campomaiorense players
O Elvas C.A.D. players
Associação Académica de Coimbra – O.A.F. players
Rio Ave F.C. players
Leça F.C. players
Association football defenders
Primeira Liga players